Reflection of You is a South Korean television series directed by Lim Hyeon-wook and starring Go Hyun-jung, Shin Hyun-been, Kim Jae-young, Choi Won-young, and Kim Sang-ho. Based on a novel by writer Jung So-hyeon, the series tells the story of a woman who leaves the conditioned lifestyle of 'wife and mother' for a brief period and becomes faithful to her desires, and another woman who comes in contact with her in that short span and loses the light of her life. It premiered on JTBC on October 13, 2021 and aired every Wednesday and Thursday at 22:30 KST till December 2. The series is available for streaming on Netflix.

Synopsis
Jeong Hee-joo (Go Hyun-jung) had a tough time in her youth, but has become a successful painter and essayist. Her husband, Ahn Hyeon-seong (Choi Won-young), is a rich and powerful person. With their two children, they seem to enjoy a perfect family life, but Hee-joo feels like she is spending her time pointlessly. She meets Gu Hae-won (Shin Hyun-been), an art teacher who lacks worldly means, but is still full of life.

Cast

Main
 Go Hyun-jung as Jeong Hee-joo
A successful painter and essayist, daughter-in-law of Taerim Corporation.
 Shin Hyun-been as Gu Hae-won
Substitute art teacher at Taerim Girls' Middle School.
 Kim Jae-young as Seo Woo-jae 
A sculptor and Hae-won's senior from art school.
 Choi Won-young as Ahn Hyeon-seong
Hee-joo's husband, Principal of Taerim Girls' Middle School and Chairman of Taerim Foundation.

Supporting

People around Jeong Hee-joo 
 Kim Bo-yeon as Park Young-sun 
Hee-joo's mother-in-law, Director of Taerim Hospital.
 Shin Dong-wook as Jeong Seon-woo
Hee-joo's younger brother, physiotherapist at Taerim Hospital.
 Jang Hye-jin as Ahn Min-seo
Hee-joo's sister-in-law, Chief of Neurosurgery at Taerim Hospital.
 Hong Seo-jun as Lee Hyung-ki
Min-seo's husband, a legal counsellor for Taerim Foundation.
 Kim Su-an as Ahn Li-sa
Hee-joo's teenage daughter, a 3rd grader at Taerim Girls' Middle School.
 Kim Dong-ha as Ahn Ho-su
Hee-joo's son, a kindergartener.
 Park Sung-yeon as Lee Dong-mi
Hee-joo's friend, owner of the fishing grounds.
 Yang Jo-ah as Li-sa's new tutor

People around Gu Hae-won 
 Lee Ho-jae as Gu Kwang-mo
Hae-won's grandfather.
 Seo Jeong-yeon as Gu Jeong-yeon
Hae-won's mother, a cosmetics door-to-door seller.
 Kim Sang-ho as Yoon Sang-ho
The owner of a new bar in Hae-won's neighbourhood.
 Shin Hye-ji as Lee Joo-young
Ahn Li-sa's classmate and best-friend, who records everything on her phone.
 Seo Jin-won as Lee Il-seong
A former professional billiards player, who maintains a billiard room. Lee Joo-young's father.

Others 
 Kim Ho-jung as Lee Jung-eun
Director of Hwain Gallery.
 Han Jae-yi as Yoon Jeong
A curator at Hwain Gallery.
 Kang Ae-sim as Ok-su
Mother of Jeong Sun-woo's late friend.

Production
In November 2020, Go Hyun-jung was confirmed to appear in the TV series. The drama serves as her comeback, after a hiatus of more than two years. Her last appearance was in 2019 TV series My Lawyer, Mr. Jo 2: Crime and Punishment. At the end of June 2021, Park Seong-yeon joined the cast. On August 6, it was reported that due to a positive case of COVID-19, the filming was stopped. The main cast of the series tested negative.

The series is based on a novel of the same name by writer Jung So-hyeon. Yoo Bo-ra has adapted the story of the novel and gave it a different perspective.

Release
Reflection of You was released on October 13, 2021 and airs on Wednesday and Thursday at new fall timings of 22:30 KST. The series is also available worldwide on Netflix for streaming.

Original soundtrack

Part 1

Part 2

Part 3

Part 4

Part 5

Viewership
Audience response
The series climbed up in Netflix's rankings to figure in top ten in the week ending on November 14 in South Korea.

Awards and nominations

References

External links
  
  Reflection of You at Naver 
 Reflection of You at Daum 
 
 
 

JTBC television dramas
2021 South Korean television series debuts
2021 South Korean television series endings
Television series by JTBC Studios
Television series by Celltrion Entertainment
Television shows based on South Korean novels
Television productions suspended due to the COVID-19 pandemic
Korean-language Netflix exclusive international distribution programming